Gun Lords of Stirrup Basin is a 1937 American Western film directed by Sam Newfield for Supreme Pictures. It stars Bob Steele, Louis Stanley, and Karl Hackett.

Plot

Cast
 Bob Steele as Dan Stockton
 Louis Stanley as Gail Dawson Stockton
 Karl Hackett as Gabe Bowdre
 Ernie Adams as Red
 Frank Ball as Hub Stockton

See also
 Bob Steele filmography

External links
 
 

1937 films
American black-and-white films
American Western (genre) films
Films directed by Sam Newfield
1937 Western (genre) films
Films with screenplays by George H. Plympton
1930s American films